Monika Todorovska (born 10 April 1995) is a Macedonian footballer who plays as a defender for the North Macedonia national team.

International career
Todorovska made her debut for the North Macedonia national team on 10 April 2014, against Spain.

References

1995 births
Living people
Women's association football defenders
Macedonian women's footballers
North Macedonia women's international footballers